Datomic is a distributed database and implementation of Datalog. It has ACID transactions, joins, and a logical query language, Datalog. A distinguishing feature of Datomic is that time is a basic feature of data entities.

Architecture

It has been designed for first-class use with JVM languages such as Java and Clojure.

In its reference architecture, Datomic uses peers and transactors which run on the JVM.

References 

2012 software
NoSQL
Logic programming languages
Proprietary cross-platform software
Proprietary database management systems